Zalzala is a 1988 Bollywood action adventure film directed by Harish Shah. It stars Dharmendra, Shatrughan Sinha, Rajiv Kapoor, Anita Raj, Kimi Katkar, Vijayeta Pandit, Danny Denzongpa and in lead roles. It is a loose rehash of 1969 Western, Mackenna's Gold.

Plot 
The narrator starts the movie with a myth that there is a hidden golden temple full of treasures. None can reach there without the map and one old priest only knows the way to the temple. In the other side of the story, Inspector Shiv Kumar arrested dacoit Sona Singh, who is madly in search of that hidden temple. Sona Sing broke into the jail and killed Shiv's wife Radha. Radha was an orphan and it is revealed later that she was the only sister of Shankar (Man with no name). In another occasion, inspector Shiv met with one vagabond Bholey and Radha's brother Shankar. To take revenge for Radha's death, Shiv Kumar resigned from the police service and chased Sona Singh's gang, but unfortunately was captured by them. Sona Singh told him to guide them to the hidden golden temple, because only Shiv knows the map of the area. The old man informed Shiv about the path to the temple before his death. The full gang of dacoit and Shiv started a hard journey towards the temple. Shankar, Bholey and their respective fiancée also accompanied Shiv.

Cast
 Dharmendra as Inspector Shiv Kumar		
 Shatrughan Sinha as Shankar / Benaam
 Rajiv Kapoor as Bhole
 Rati Agnihotri as Radha (Sp. App.)
 Anita Raj as Sheela
 Kimi Katkar as Reshma
 Vijayta Pandit as Paro
 Lalita Pawar as Sheela's Mother
 Danny Denzongpa as Sona Singh
 Gulshan Grover as Heera Singh
 Dan Dhanoa as Moti Singh
 Puneet Issar as Shera
 C. S. Dubey as Mukhiya
 Goga Kapoor as Goon
 Jagdeep as Groom		
 Pinchoo Kapoor as Groom's Friend
 Satyendra Kapoor as Police Commissioner
 Sudhir Dalvi as Priest
 Tiku Talsania as Groom's dad

Music
"Holi Aayi Re, Aayi Re Aayi Holi Aayi" - Shailendra Singh, Anuradha Paudwal, Sudesh Bhosle
"Mar Jayenge Hum" - Hari Om Sharan, Uday Mazumdar, Mohammed Aziz, Hariharan
"Are Chaaku Chale Tere Liye Bazaaro Me" - Kavita Krishnamurthy, Kishore Kumar
"Dil Hai Kab Kis Pe Sarkar" - Asha Bhosle

References

External links
 

1988 films
1980s Hindi-language films
1980s action adventure films
1988 Western (genre) films
Indian action adventure films
Indian Western (genre) films
Films scored by R. D. Burman
Treasure hunt films